Buckingham Browne & Nichols School, often referred to as BB&N, is an independent  co-educational day school in Cambridge, Massachusetts, educating students from pre-kindergarten (called Beginners) through twelfth grade. BB&N is regularly ranked among the top independent schools in the United States. The School has produced three of the 27 Presidential Scholars from Massachusetts since the inception of the program in 1964 and is a member of the G30 Schools group and the Round Square global education association. BB&N includes six Rhodes Scholars among its graduates.

The School occupies four campuses: a Lower School on Buckingham Street, a Middle School on Sparks Street, an Upper School on Gerry's Landing Road, and an office building on Belmont Street. In 2017 the school consisted of 1017 students, 146 faculty, and 148 administrators and staff.

BB&N was founded in 1974 from the merger of two schools, Browne & Nichols School and the Buckingham School. Prior to the merger, Browne & Nichols was a boys school consisting of grades 7-12; Buckingham School enrolled students in grades K-12: boys and girls in grades K-6 and girls only in grades 7-12.

Federal judge Nathaniel M. Gorton is the former chair of the school's board of trustees.

Origins
Browne & Nichols School (B&N) was founded in 1883 by George Henry Browne, a 25-year-old Harvard graduate who, having embarked on a career as a teacher of Latin and English literature, attracted the attention of his former professors Francis J. Child and Charles Eliot Norton. Seeking an alternative to the Cambridge public schools, Child and Norton recruited Browne to teach their three sons and two other boys. At the end of that year, Browne enlisted his Harvard classmate Edgar H. Nichols to join him as the co-head of a new college preparatory school, which opened in the fall with an enrollment of 17, a number that quickly expanded.

The Buckingham School was named and incorporated in 1902, but the first schoolhouse was opened in 1892, known as Miss Markham's School after its founding headmistress. Because Jeanette Markham had been conducting classes for small children in a private school since at least 1889, that is the year from which Buckingham dates its beginning.

Markham came to Cambridge from Atchison, Kansas to pursue an education at the recently founded women's college later named Radcliffe. Upon arriving in Cambridge, she found a home with Colonel Thomas Wentworth Higginson on Buckingham Street, to whom she is said to have become "virtually an elder daughter" (59). After she began teaching in a neighbor's home, another neighbor, Mrs. Richard H. Dana, offered to build a schoolhouse and living quarters nearby, where the school began with 12 students. That schoolhouse continues to be part of BB&N's Lower School campus to this day.

School buildings and campuses

During the year 1882–1883, before Browne & Nichols came into formal existence, founder George H. Browne taught his small group of students in two rooms in Harvard's Felton Hall. With the formation of the school in 1883, instruction took place at 11 Appian Way, with the addition of another building at 8 Garden Street. Radcliffe College, which now occupies this land, wished to expand here, and so it made an exchange with B&N, which relocated in 1897 to a new brick building at 20 Garden Street.  That building was designed by Edgar Nichols's sister-in-law, Minerva Parker Nichols, and is said to be "the first important building by a woman architect." None of these buildings remains today, except for the 11 Appian Way building, relocated around the corner to 3 Garden Street and now serving as an Episcopal Church rectory.

In 1911–1913 the school was incorporated and acquired several acres of farmland near Gerry's Landing, a property dedicated as the "Nichols Athletic Field," a name by which it is still known. In 1924 the school acquired the contiguous three acres with a gift from Mrs. Kuno Francke in memory of her son Hugo, after whom the field is still named.  Francke Field was expanded to its present dimensions through an exchange of property with the Shady Hill School, which by this time had moved to its current location directly next to B&N's two athletic fields.

A 1928 plan to move B&N to the Gerry's Landing property foundered in the wake of the Great Depression, but enough money was raised to relocate the Lower School there. Finally, in 1948, a large donation allowed the rest of the school to follow, and the Garden Street campus was sold. Major additions to the new campus's structure followed: a gymnasium and locker room in 1952; the Almy Building in 1956, initially constructed to house grades 7–9; an expansion of the 1928 boathouse in 1959; the Pratt Building in 1960 for the lower school; the Bradford Building in 1962, which included an auditorium and the school's first library; and the enclosed Bright Hockey-Tennis facility in 1966, all of them now part of the Upper School campus.  Multiple additional renovations and expansions have occurred over the past 50 years, most notably the Nicholas Athletic Center and Renaissance Hall.

The Buckingham School started in a wooden two-story building constructed on the site of a pear orchard at the corner of Buckingham Street and Buckingham Place and opened in 1892. That building, today known as Markham House, still stands. In 1921 the school expanded three additional grades to include college preparation and needing additional space acquired the contiguous property along Parker Street, where it built the large brick building that still occupies the site. In 1924 the school purchased four acres of land on Larch Road, near Fresh Pond, for use in physical education, which continues to serve BB&N's athletic program despite the City of Cambridge House Authority's narrowly averted attempt in 1968 to seize the land by eminent domain to build housing for the aged.  In 1929 the school acquired another private home known then and ever since as Kelsey House.

Just one year after B&N made its most important expansion, the Buckingham School did the same, with the purchase of a large residence, constructed in 1859, on nearby Sparks Street. This became Buckingham's Upper School. In 1954 it was expanded with a new wing, named after former headmistress Marian Vaillant when the wing was again expanded in 1969. That same year the acquisition of property along Craigie Street provided space for the kindergarten and grades one and two in the newly constructed Morse Building.

Merger
When Peter K. Gunness, Director of Financial Aid at Harvard, was appointed to succeed Edwin Pratt, who retired after twenty years as B&N's headmaster in 1969, Buckingham headmistress Elizabeth Stowe suggested that the two schools should begin exploring cooperative opportunities beyond the joint musical and dramatic ventures that had begun during the Pratt years. For the next two years the schools collaborated on several classes on the two campuses, and the drama clubs formally merged.

During the 1971–1972 school year, fifteen classes included students from both schools, and the following year all sixty eleventh and twelfth graders at Buckingham took their classes on the B&N campus with their male counterparts. Discussions about a formal merger began early in 1973, resulting in the creation of the new coeducational school Buckingham Browne & Nichols, effective January 1, 1974. Elizabeth Stowe's retirement resulted in Peter Gunness's appointment as the first head of the new school.

The Gerry's Landing Road campus became BB&N's Upper School, the Sparks Street campus the Middle School, and the Buckingham and Craigie Streets campus the Lower School. They have remained in these locations.

A fourth campus occupies a former parochial school at 46 Belmont Street in Watertown, where BB&N's support staff, including business, human resources, alumni/ae affairs, archives, and other departments are located. In addition, a cooperative day care center, founded by faculty for their children (but also open to others), uses the bottom floor.

Bivouac
A distinctive feature of BB&N's Upper School is the Bivouac program, which B&N inaugurated in 1951 on privately owned land in Temple, Maine. The program's goals, as expressed from the beginning, are to "help students develop a sense of confidence in their own ability to cope with unexpected and challenging situations and to cultivate in the students an awareness of all members of a community."

Initially reserved for eighth graders, since 1957 the program has included all ninth graders. In 1975 it moved to school property at the former Camp Marienfeld, in Harrisville, New Hampshire.

After the two schools merged, boys and girls participated in separate Bivouacs, until 1980 when they were combined.  For eleven days the ninth grade, under the supervision of faculty and eleventh and twelfth grade "junior guides," lives outdoors, organized in squads of seven or eight students, and participates in courses, team- and trust-building exercises, and elective activities such as going on an overnight solo. Students entering BB&N after ninth grade participate in a shortened version of the program.

Academic program
The Upper School's academic program includes approximately 150 courses offered each year within six departments. The World Language Department offers courses on at least four levels in six different languages: Arabic, Chinese, French, Latin, Russian, and Spanish. In 2016 seventeen different Advanced Placement courses were offered. Offerings in the Mathematics and Computer Sciences Department run from Algebra I to Linear Algebra and Multivariable Calculus. The History Department includes a global history requirement and multiple elective offerings.

Arts program
Visual Arts courses include Drawing and Painting, Ceramics, Photography, Art Across Boundaries, Film and Video, Design and Architecture, and Woodworking. Performing Art courses include Chamber Music, Chorale, Drama, jazz ensembles, and a full orchestra.

Athletics program
Athletics are offered across all three seasons in 25 different sports, most with varsity and junior varsity teams, and some with a third team. The majority of teams compete in the 16-school Independent School League, of which BB&N has been a member since the League was founded in 1948.

Senior spring project
After spring break in March, seniors undertake a Spring Project that they designed during the fall and winter. Most projects consist of some ongoing features, such as AP courses or athletics, along with specially designed classes, internships, community service, and numerous other options. Students may also devote their entire projects to ventures off-campus, sometimes in foreign countries.

Travel and exchange opportunities
Complementing the Upper School's language program, each of the six language offerings sponsor annual or biennial travel opportunities to China, France, Greece or Italy (Latin), the Middle East (Arabic), Russia, and Spain. The Russian trip, one of several student exchanges, began in 1988 as a way of easing Cold War tensions. In addition, AP Art History makes an annual trip to Italy, and most spring varsity sports make a spring training trip. A special financial aid program enables students who cannot afford these trips to participate.

Other trip destinations have included Switzerland and Costa Rica.

Student publications

BB&N's student publications have enjoyed a long history and won many national honors. The official student newspaper, The Vanguard, established at the time of the merger, publishes an issue nearly every month. Its predecessors stretch back to B&N's The Spectator, founded in 1906, which evolved into a literary magazine in 1959 and remains such today.

The CHASM, (Current Happenings Across STEM) magazine, is the school's STEM-based publication.

The Spectator, BB&N's art and literary magazine, has been in production ever since its foundation in 1906 by two students of Browne and Nichols. In 2017, the magazine was awarded with a gold medal from the Columbia Scholastic Press Association.

In 1950 B&N students published their first annual yearbook, titled The Torch, a reference to B&N's school seal designed by renowned sculptor Cyrus E. Dallin. A yearbook has been produced every year since and is now called The Perspective.

In 2007, a triannual political magazine was founded known as The Point of View. In addition, a satirical newspaper called The Mouthguard and a television news program called The Knightly News are produced intermittently.

For several years Middle School students have also published a newspaper known as The Spark.

Athletics

Participation in sports is required at BB&N, though students can obtain waivers for extensive arts commitments or for community service. BB&N is a member of the Independent School League, and the boys' teams have a long-lasting traditional rivalry with the Belmont Hill School.

Baseball
The varsity baseball team won ISL titles in 1999, 2001, 2002, 2009, and 2010, going undefeated with a perfect 15–0 record, in 2015 and 2016 (shared).

Basketball
The team has won several ISL championships for basketball. Both the girls and boys team have combined to see nine 1,000 point scorers and many players go on to play at the collegiate level.

Fencing
The BB&N Fencing Team fields Épée, Sabre, and Foil squads for both men and women. Over the years, the team has had numerous individual state champions, a national Division III champion and, in 2013, 2014 and 2017, won the Massachusetts High School State Championship.

Football
The varsity football team won the NEPSAC Class B Super Bowl in 2006, the Class A Super Bowl and ISL Title in 2008, and the 2010 Jack Etter Bowl, named for BB&N's long time athletic director. The 2016 Knights football team completed their 2016 campaign as ISL Champions and capped the season with a win in the Ken O’Keefe NEPSAC Class A Super Bowl, finishing up with a final record of 7–2. The 2018 Knights finished their season with a 8–1 record winning the ISL and the Class A Championship. 2018 marked the 15th straight season without a losing record and was the 5th bowl victory in the last 12 years.

Golf
The co-ed Golf team won their first ISL Kingman Tournament title in 2008- and then 2 more times in 2014 and 2015. In 2015 and 2016 they won the Team Stroke Play Championship (The Kingman Tournament) In 2015, for the first time in school history, the team united the ISL Championship Trophy with the Kingsman Trophy.

Rowing
The name of the school's athletic teams, "the Knights", has its origins in a 1920s Boston Globe article which referred to the rowing team in particular, undefeated against the likes of Harvard, MIT and Kent School, as "the Black Knights of the Charles", itself a reference to the Army Black Knights. In addition to taking the team name, Browne & Nichols also took black and white as its colors after the article. The Buckingham School's colors, blue and gold, were made the combined school's colors after the merger. The school was the first American schoolboy crew to win the Henley Royal Regatta in Henley-on-Thames, England, winning the Thames Challenge Cup in 1929.  The Washington Post commented:
"The Thames Challenge Cup, prize of England's famous rowing tournament, was captured today by eight young  oarsmen from the Browne and Nichols School...The American boys, after each victory, gave a fine display of school spirit and overflowing "pep" which added to their already great popularity on the river...Their success was the more impressive when it is considered that the average age of the oarsmen is younger than the average of their defeated rivals.  The boys will be received by the American Ambassador at London Monday and then will begin an educational tour of England."

Soccer

In 2004, the boys' varsity soccer team, led by head coach Jesse Sarzana, won the New England Class A Championship. The soccer team won the first outright ISL title in school history in 2007 on their way to a Class A finals appearance. The team won their second ISL championship in 2009 but lost in the class A semi-finals. In 1996 and 1997 the girls' varsity soccer team won the New England Class A Championship. They also won the ISL title in 1997 while maintaining an undefeated and untied record.

Tennis
In 2004, the girls varsity tennis team became ISL Champions for the first time in school history. The boys varsity tennis team won the New England Class B Tournament in 2004, the 2005 ISL Championship, and finished second in the 2007 New England Class B Tournament.

Other sports
In 2004, the varsity sailing team was undefeated in the regular season. They also won 1st place in the first division of the Mass Bay League regatta in 2017.

In the past four years, BB&N wrestling has had 6 league champions, 4 league runners-up, and multiple league placers, and has had multiple representatives at the national tournament and New England tournament.

BB&N formed a robotics team and has begun participating at a varsity level in competitions between other schools as of 2019.

BB&N also has both girls' and boys' hockey teams, although the boys team has had a losing record in the past 4 years and has had 3 different coaches throughout that time.

Notable alumni

Browne & Nichols
Edward Burlingame Hill, class of 1888, American composer
Langdon Warner, class of 1898, archaeologist, art historian, and member of World War II Monuments Men
Richard Norton, archaeologist, professor, director of the Archaeological Institute of America
Arthur L. Conger, class of 1899, noted theosophist and writer
Alfred V. Kidder, class of 1903, preeminent early twentieth century archaeologist of the American Southwest and Mesoamerica
Thomas Dudley Cabot, class of 1913, American businessman and philanthropist
William Bosworth Castle, class of 1914, American physician and pioneer in field of hematology
Tadeusz Adamowski, class of 1918, hockey player on Polish Olympic Team (1928), coach of national team
Sherwin Badger, class of 1918, national figure skating champion and Silver Medal Olympian
John Moors Cabot, class of 1919, U.S. Ambassador to five nations, Georgetown University professor
Robert Bradford, class of 1920, Governor of Massachusetts
Thomas Hopkinson Eliot, class of 1924, congressman from Massachusetts and chancellor of Washington University in St. Louis, prominent politician and major figure behind the Social Security Act 
Eliot Noyes, class of 1927, architect and industrial designer
John Caskey, class of 1927, American archaeologist and excavator of Troy
George C. Homans, class of 1927, American sociologist and founder of behavioral sociology
C. Conrad Wright, class of 1933, scholar and American religious historian
Charles Pence Slichter, class of 1941, nuclear physicist and winner of the National Medal of Science
Robert Brink, class of 1942, violinist, conductor, professor, who premiered works by Walter Piston, Henry Cowell, Alan Hovhaness, and Daniel Pinkham
Richard A. Smith, class of 1942, president of General Cinemas, later CEO of Harcourt General
Roger Longrigg, class of 1945, Scottish-born author of 55 popular novels
Giles Constable, class of 1946, educator and historian of the Middle Ages
Kirk Bryan, class of 1947, oceanographer regarded as founder of numerical ocean modeling
Charles Colson, class of 1949, chief counsel to President Richard Nixon, Watergate indictee
Anthony Perkins, class of 1950, actor most famous for Psycho, Equus, and Friendly Persuasion
Jonathan Moore, class of 1950, high-ranking government official specializing in foreign affairs
Allan Rosenfield, class of 1951, physician and advocate for women's health
Anton Kuerti, class of 1952, pianist
Robert M. O'Neil, class of 1952, college president and founder of the Thomas Jefferson Center for the Protection of Free Expression
Peter Haskell, class of 1953, film and television actor
Nam Pyo Suh, class of 1955, president of KAIST
Truman Bewley, class of 1959, economist, authority on sticky wages and namesake of Bewley models
Deirdre McCloskey, class of 1960, economist, historian, and rhetorician
Paul Michael Glaser, class of 1961 (did not graduate), actor
Chris Burden, class of 1964, performance/conceptual artist
Paul Williams, class of 1965, founder of Crawdaddy magazine
Ben Bradlee Jr., class of 1966, The Boston Globe journalist and author
Jeffrey Lurie, class of 1969, owner of Philadelphia Eagles
Andy Pratt (singer-songwriter), class of 1969, rock music singer-songwriter and multi-instrumentalist
Alexander Vershbow, class of 1970, former Ambassador to the Republic of Korea, former Ambassador to Russia, former Ambassador to NATO
Dennis Choi, class of 1970, educator and neuroscientist
Patrick Sullivan, class of 1971, former general manager of New England Patriots
 Dave Hynes, class of 1969, former professional hockey player for the Boston Bruins

Buckingham
Katharine Sergeant Angell White, class of 1910, writer and fiction editor for The New Yorker magazine, 1925–1960
Helen B. Taussig, class of 1912, cardiologist and founder of field of pediatric cardiology
Helenka Pantaleoni, class of 1914, silent film actress and humanitarian
Eleanor Sayre, class of 1934, museum curator and authority on prints of Francisco Goya
Joanne Simpson, class of 1940, NASA's lead weather researcher and first woman to earn a Ph.D. in meteorology
Eleanor Sanger, class of 1946, Emmy Award-winning TV sports producer
Margaret Bryan Davis, class of 1949, distinguished ecologist specializing in palynology and paleoecology
Svetlana Alpers, class of 1953, noted art historian and author of The Art of Describing
Susan Howe, class of 1955, poet, scholar, essayist, and critic
Jane Holtz Kay, class of 1956, urban design and architecture critic
Fanny Howe, class of 1958, poet, short story writer, and novelist
Toby Lerner Ansin, Class of 1959, Founder, Miami City Ballet
Ellen Goodman, class of 1959, Pulitzer Prize-winning journalist
Margaret Atherton, Class of 1961, historian and philosopher
Annalena Tonelli, Class of 1962, social activist known as "Mother Teresa of Somalia"
Sylvia Poggioli, Class of 1964, NPR European Correspondent
Mary Lord, Class of 1971, journalist
Susan Butcher, Class of 1972, dog musher and four-time winner of the Iditarod Trail Sled Dog Race

BB&N
John Grayken, class of 1974, founder and chairman of Lone Star funds
André Balazs, class of 1975, hotelier and residential developer
Hilary Bok, class of 1976, Henry R. Luce Professor of Bioethics and Moral & Political Theory at the Johns Hopkins University.
Charles Bailyn, class of 1977, the A. Bartlett Giamatti Professor of Astronomy and Physics at Yale University and inaugural dean of faculty at Yale-NUS College
James E. Baker, class of 1978, former Chief Judge of the United States Court of Appeals for the Armed Forces
Kate Davis, class of 1978, documentary filmmaker 
Reed Hastings, class of 1978, founder and CEO of Netflix
Jonathan Collier, class of 1979, television writer for The Simpsons and others
Abigail Johnson, class of 1980, Fidelity Investments
Wendy Artin, class of 1980, internationally exhibited painter
 David Cohen, class of 1981, attorney and Deputy Director of the Central Intelligence Agency from 2015–17
Melinda McGraw, class of 1981, film and television actress
Michael Sloan, class of 1981, Pulitzer Prize-winning illustrator and co-creator of comic Welcome to the New World
David Kris, class of 1984, lawyer and national security expert
Peter Ocko, class of 1984, television writer and producer
David Sze, class of 1984, Greylock Partners, investor in Facebook and LinkedIn
Katie Goodman, class of 1986, musical satirist and comedian, theater writer and director
Michael Moynihan, class of 1987 (did not graduate), journalist, publisher and musician
Nicole Cherubini, class of 1988, sculptor and visual artist
Peter Beinart, class of 1989, editor of New Republic and Rhodes Scholar
Agata Passent, class of 1991, Polish journalist and writer
Alison Folland, class of 1997, award-winning film actress
Mindy Kaling, class of 1997, actress and writer on NBC's The Office; creator and star of Fox's The Mindy Project
Courtney Kennedy, class of 1997, US National Hockey Team player
Scott Belsky, class of 1998, entrepreneur, author, co-creator of online portfolio platform Behance
Joseph P. Kennedy III, class of 1999, Representative for Massachusetts' 4th Congressional District
Rachel Platten, class of 1999, singer and songwriter of "Fight Song"
Ari Graynor, class of 2001, Broadway and Hollywood actress
Josh Zakim, class of 2001, Boston City Councilor
Loren Galler-Rabinowitz, class of 2004, noted figure skater; Miss Massachusetts 2010
Jack Carlson class of 2005, U.S. national team rower, World Championships bronze medalist, author
Sarah Bullard, class of 2007, professional women's lacrosse player
Jake Rosenzweig, class of 2007, racing driver
Marina Keegan, class of 2008, author of The Opposite of Loneliness
Stephanie McCaffrey, class of 2011, professional soccer player
Andrew Chin, class of 2011, baseball player
Rhett Wiseman, class of 2012, professional baseball player

References

External links
 Official site
 
 Buckingham Browne & Nichols School on Instagram. Archived from the original on ghostarchive.org

Educational institutions established in 1883
Private high schools in Massachusetts
Independent School League
Schools in Middlesex County, Massachusetts
Education in Cambridge, Massachusetts
Private middle schools in Massachusetts
Private elementary schools in Massachusetts
Private K-12 schools in the United States
1883 establishments in Massachusetts